The Hong Kong Ladies Open is a golf tournament on the Ladies Asian Golf Tour hosted in Hong Kong since 2015. It is played at the Old Course in Fanling in Hong Kong Golf Club. 

In 2017, EFG became the tournament's first title sponsor. The prize money of the tournament is US$150,000 and players would be offered Rolex Ranking points.

Winners
2019 Liu Yan
2018 Saranporn Langkulgasettrin
2017 Supamas Sangchan
2016 Tiffany Chan (amateur)
2015 Lee Jeong-hwa

References

Ladies Asian Golf Tour events
Golf tournaments in Hong Kong
Recurring sporting events established in 2015
2015 establishments in Hong Kong